The Washing Bay is a small bay on the south-west corner of Lough Neagh, in County Tyrone, Northern Ireland. It is in the civil parish of Clonoe, the barony of Dungannon Middle, and the Mid Ulster District Council area.

Sport
Derrylaughan Kevin Barrys is the local Gaelic Athletic Association club.

References

Civil parish of Clonoe
Dungannon and South Tyrone Borough Council
Lough Neagh